Ahmed Bouzfour (born 1940s, in Taza) is a Moroccan novelist.

Biography 
Born in the early 1940s near to Taza, Bouzfour received his primary education and learned the Qur'an in a Quranic school. He then studied at the University of Al Qaraouiyine in Fès, where he completed his high school studies and obtained a baccalauréat in 1966. After that, he was arrested and incarcerated during three months for his political activism.

Bouzfour continued his studies in the "Faculty of Humanities and Human Science" in Mohammed V University, in Rabat, where he obtained a licence (Academic degree) of Arabic literature, then, in 1972, a master in modern Moroccan literature. 

His first novella, Yas'alounaka âni al-qatl (يسألونك عن القتل) was published in 1971 in Al-Alam (العلم), a Moroccan newspaper belonging to the Istiqlal Party.

Works 
 Ta'abbaṭa shiâran (تأبط شعرا)
 Three collections of novellas :
An-naḍar fi al-wajh al-âaziz (النظر في الوجه العزيز) in 1983.
Al-Ġābir Al-Ḍāhir (الغابر الظاهر) en 1987.
Sayyād al-Naâam (صياد النعام) en 1993.
 Dīwān as-sindibād (ديوان السندباد)
 Az-zarāfa al-mushtaâila (الزرافة المشتعلة): Points of view about Moroccan modern stories.

See also 

 Short story
 Moroccan literature
 Arabic literature

References

External links
 (Arabic) Author's personal website, which contained his biography and some documents (Archived 2009-10-24)
  Press article talking about his refusal to the Moroccan "Book's prize"

Moroccan writers
Moroccan male short story writers
Moroccan short story writers
University of al-Qarawiyyin alumni
Mohammed V University alumni
1940s births
Living people
People from Taza

References 
Much of the content of this article comes from the equivalent French-language Wikipedia article, accessed June 11, 2007.